Hugh C. Graham, Jr is an American figure skater.

He competed as a singles skater and as a pair skater with his sister, Margaret Anne Graham. After his competitive career ended, he spent from 1986 to 1989 as the President of the United States Figure Skating Association. Graham was inducted into the United States Figure Skating Hall of Fame in 2004.

Graham graduated Harvard University in 1955, during which he was a member of the Skating Club of Boston, and then he graduated from the University of Chicago Pritzker School of Medicine in 1959. He practiced as a pediatrician in Tulsa, Oklahoma for several decades before retiring.

Results

Men's singles

Pairs
(with Margaret Anne Graham)

References

American male single skaters
American male pair skaters
Figure skating officials
Year of birth missing (living people)
Living people
Pritzker School of Medicine alumni
Harvard College alumni